Colors Live (stylized as Colors_LIVE) is the first video album by American progressive metal band Between the Buried and Me. It was released on October 14, 2008. The concert was filmed at the Rocketown in Nashville, Tennessee on Friday, August 2, 2008. The album peaked at number 100 on the Billboard 200 chart.

The band played two sets during the concert—the first included the band's 2007 Colors album in its entirety and the second was of previously released songs as voted by fans via a special website. The DVD includes both sets. The audio CD contains only the band's performance of Colors.

The DVD is mixed in Dolby Stereo, contrary to the most current live releases which make heavy use of surround sound. There is a slideshow on the DVD including photography from David Shaw and Eric Dale; both photographers took all photography for the CD and DVD.

Track listing
DVD
Set 1:
 "Foam Born (A) The Backtrack"
 "(B) The Decade of Statues"
 "Informal Gluttony"
 "Sun of Nothing"
 "Ants of the Sky"
 "Prequel to the Sequel"
 "Viridian"
 "White Walls"

Set 2:
 "Mordecai" (from The Silent Circus)
 "Shevanel Cut a Flip" (from Self-titled album)
 "Backwards Marathon" (from Alaska)
 "Ad a Dglgmut" (from The Silent Circus)
 "Aspirations" (from Self-titled album)
 "Selkies: The Endless Obsession" (from Alaska)

Track listing
CD
Lyrics written by Tommy Giles Rogers Jr. Music written by Between the Buried and Me.

Personnel
Between the Buried and Me
 Tommy Giles Rogers Jr. – lead vocals, keyboards
 Paul Waggoner – guitars, backing vocals
 Dustie Waring – guitars
 Dan Briggs – bass, backing vocals
 Blake Richardson – drums, percussion

Technical personnel
 Jamie King – mixing, production
 Shane Holloman – film director, production
 Michael Quinlan – assistant director
 April Kimbrell – film producer
 Craig Hill – film producer
 James Pickett – dolly grip
 Kyle Spicer – camera
 Phillip Allen – camera
 Trevor Wild – camera
 Wes Richardson – camera
 Kyle Rullmann – dolly camera
 United Saints – filming
 Courtney Warner – sound engineering
 Chuck Johnson – lighting
 Jimmy Chang – technician, stage manager
 Brandon Proff – artwork
 CK Cates – photography director
 David Shaw – photography
 Eric Dale – photography

References

Between the Buried and Me albums
2008 video albums
Live video albums
2008 live albums